Amentane is a small village in Algeria,  in the wilaya of Batna.

References 

Communes of Batna Province